Protestant University in the Congo (or UPC), is a university in  the Democratic Republic of the Congo, affiliated with the Protestant Church which is known in the country as the Church of Christ in the Congo.

Location
The university's campus is located in the neighborhood called Lingwala, in the Lukunga District of Kinshasa, the capital and largest city of the Democratic Republic of the Congo. The campus is bounded to the west by Avenue Pierre Mulele, immediately north of the Centenary Protestant Cathedral and adjacent to the National Museum of Congo, which lies to the south and south-east of the campus. The geographical coordinates of UPC campus are 4°19'59.0"S, 15°17'52.0"E (Latitude:-4.333056; Longitude:15.297778).

Overview
The UPC traces its origins to the establishment of the Faculty of Protestant Theology of the Belgian Congo and Ruanda-Urundi (Faculté de Théologie Protestante du Congo Belge et du Rwanda-Urundi) in 1959. It became the Faculty of Protestant Theology in Free University of the Congo in 1963 and was later folded into the National University of Zaire (UNAZA) as part of the centralization of secondary education in the country in 1971. It was subsequently re-established an independent body in 1974 when UNAZA was securalised. As of 2015, it was the largest Protestant university in the world, with a student enrollment of approximately  8,000. At that time, 55 percent of the students were female and 45 percent were male.

Academics
As of September 2015, UPC had the following faculties as illustrated in the table below. The year each faculty was established is also shown.

Religious diversity
The table below illustrates the religious diversity among registered students in the university, as of September 2015.

Prominent alumni
 Ève Bazaiba, Democratic Republic of the Congolese lawyer, politician and human rights activist. Former Senator. Secretary General of the Movement for the Liberation of the Congo (MLC).

 Acacia Bandubola Mbongo, Congolese businesswoman and politician. Current Minister of the Economy in the Cabinet of the Democratic Republic the Congo, since August 2019.

 Gael Bussa, Congolese lawyer, politician and human rights activist. He was elected National Deputy in the constituency of Budjala, in the province of South-Ubangi, in the 2018 Democratic Republic of the Congo general election.

See also
 List of universities in the Democratic Republic of the Congo
 Education in the Democratic Republic of the Congo

References

External links
 Homepage of Protestant University of Congo

Universities in the Democratic Republic of the Congo
Educational institutions established in 1959
Education in Kinshasa
Kinshasa
Protestantism in the Democratic Republic of the Congo
1959 establishments in the Belgian Congo